Masu Junyangdikul (born June 9, 1994), nickname Masu, is a Thai actor, model and DJ.

Early life and education
Masu was born on June 9, 1994 in Bangkok, Thailand.

Masu graduated junior high school from Roong Aroon School and upper secondary level from Wat Suthiwararam School. He continued to study the undergraduate level at the Faculty of Communication Arts, Bangkok University.

Career
Masu began to enter the entertainment industry for the first time by becoming a DJ in Pynk98 wave with DJ Matoom and show sitcom Clear Siwaypink, playing as Marvin on Channel 5.

After that, in 2014, Masu signed an actor contract with Channel 3.

In 2015, his first work was the Mafia Luerd Mungkorn Series, in which he played the role of Zhou Kae-sung (young). Later, he starred in Kor Pen Jaosao Suk Krung Hai Cheun Jai, which made him known more. He also starred in the drama Bu Ram Pram Pra, which is his first lead role.

Filmography

Television series

Sitcom

Award

References

External links
 

1994 births
Living people
Masu Junyangdikul
Masu Junyangdikul
Masu Junyangdikul
Masu Junyangdikul